The Dôme de Paris (originally the Palais des Sports) is an indoor arena located in the 15th arrondissement of Paris, France. The closest metro station is Porte de Versailles.

Background
The venue was built in 1959 to replace the old Vel’ d’Hiv' at the Porte de Versailles. With a capacity of 4,600 seats, it was the largest venue in Paris. The architects and engineers created a dome with the largest light alloy dome ever designed in the world made of 1,100 aluminum panels.

Since its first season, it has presented shows and concerts, such as Little Mix, The Beatles, The Rolling Stones, Grateful Dead, Pink Floyd, Genesis, Josephine Baker, U2, Liza Minnelli, Diana Ross, Dalida, Johnny Hallyday, Sylvie Vartan, the Harlem Globetrotters, and Holiday on Ice in addition to events such as boxing matches. It is notable as being the venue where the original 1980 French production of Les Misérables premiered.

Over the years, people from all over the world have come to the Dôme de Paris to see music hall and sports legends, dancers, ice skaters, circus shows, musical shows (Les Dix Commandements, Le Roi Soleil) and other shows such as ones directed by Robert Hossein, a pioneer in big French shows.

References

Indoor arenas in France
Music venues in France
Music venues in Paris
Sports venues in Paris
Music venues completed in 1960
1960 establishments in France
Buildings and structures in the 15th arrondissement of Paris